China Open may refer to:
China Open (snooker), a professional snooker tournament
China Open (tennis), a professional tennis tournament on the ATP World Tour and WTA Tour
China Open (badminton), an annual badminton tournament
China Open (table tennis), an ITTF table tennis tournament
Volvo China Open, a golf tournament on the European Tour
Taiwan Open (golf), a defunct golf tournament on the Asian Tour and Asia Golf Circuit
China Open (boxing)
China Open (curling), a curling tournament on the World Curling Tour
China Open (pool)

See also 
China Squash Open